Hibbertia sericea, commonly known as silky guinea-flower, is a species of flowering plant in the family Dilleniaceae and is endemic to south-eastern Australia. It is an erect or spreading shrub with softly-hairy branches, elliptic to egg-shaped leaves with the narrower end towards the base, and yellow flowers with eight to fourteen stamens in a cluster on one side of two hairy carpels.

Description
Flowering occurs from August to November.

This species is highly variable and some forms are difficult to distinguish from H. crinita. Three forms, sericea, densiflora and scabridifolia, all occurring in Victoria, have been described.

Taxonomy
Hibbertia sericea  was first formally described in 1817 by Augustin Pyramus de Candolle who gave it the name Pleurandra sericea in his Regni Vegetabilis Systema Naturale from an unpublished description by Robert Brown. It was subsequently given the name Hibbertia sericea by George Bentham in 1863.

Distribution and habitat
Silky guinea-flower grows in woodland, mallee and coastal heath in south-eastern South Australia, northern Tasmania and scattered populations in Victoria and Queensland.

References

sericea
Flora of South Australia
Flora of Victoria (Australia)
Flora of Tasmania
Flora of Queensland
Taxa named by Augustin Pyramus de Candolle
Plants described in 1817